SWSS may stand for:

Socialist Workers' Student Society
South Wales Socialist Society
Southwest Stoner Society